Admiral Alfred Ernest Albert Grant (10 April 1861 – 14 August 1933) was a Royal Navy officer. During the First World War, he played an important role in shipbuilding.

Grant was the sixth son of John Glasgow Grant, CMG, sometime Speaker of the House of Assembly of Barbados. He entered HMS Britannia as a colonial cadet in 1874, and took part in the Anglo-Egyptian War of 1882.

References

External links 

 

1861 births
1933 deaths
Royal Navy admirals
Royal Navy admirals of World War I
Royal Navy personnel of the Anglo-Egyptian War
Royal Navy personnel of the Second Boer War
Recipients of the Navy Distinguished Service Medal